Alexander was a merchant ship launched at Hull in 1783 or 1784. She was one of the vessels in the First Fleet, that the British government hired to transport convicts for the European colonisation of Australia in 1788. On her return voyage from Australia the British East India Company permitted her to carry a cargo from Canton back to Britain. Thereafter she traded out of London until 1809, when she is no longer listed.

Construction and ownership 
Alexander was barque-built in Hull in 1783 with three masts and two decks. She was a plain-looking vessel, without galleries or a figurehead. At 452 tons burthen, she was the largest transport in the Fleet and carried at least 30 crew. Her owners were Walton & Company, a firm of Southwark merchants headed by master mariner William Walton. Her master was Duncan Sinclair.

Lloyd's Register for 1786 gives her master as J. Metcalf, and her trade as Petersburg-London. An amendment to the entry gives the name of a new master as W. Hunter. Lastly, it shows her launch year as 1784, and her burthen as 650 tons (bm).

Lloyd's Register for 1787 shows her master as W. Hunter and her trade as London-St. Petersburg. However, a later addition to the entry shows her master as D. Sinclair, and her trade as London-Botany Bay. It does not report any armament, which is not surprising as Britain was not at war with anyone. It still shows her launch year as 1784 and her burthen as 650 tons (bm).

First Fleet

Voyage to Australia

In early 1787, Alexander loaded her convicts at Woolwich Docks. The convicts came both from prison hulks on the Thames and directly from Newgate Prison. The ship then sailed to Portsmouth alongside  to meet the remainder of the Fleet.

Before Alexander left Portsmouth, a fever broke out on board that killed 16 men. She left Portsmouth on 13 May 1787, carrying 195 male convicts. Fifteen more convicts died on the journey, the most for any ship in the fleet. The cause of the fever was likely inadequate management of the bilge, as reported by John White, the surgeon aboard  in June 1787:
The illness complained of was wholly occasioned by the bilge water which had by some means or other risen to so great a height that the panels of the cabin and the buttons on the clothes of the officers were turned nearly black by the noxious effluvia. When the hatches were taken off the stench was so powerful it was scarcely possible to stand over them.

Complaints by Surgeons White and Balmain to First Fleet captain Arthur Phillip led to regular pumping of Alexander's bilge thereafter, with a corresponding improvement in convict health.

Mutiny
Sinclair thwarted an attempted mutiny aboard the vessel in October 1787. A band of five convicts and a number of able seamen had armed themselves with iron bars, intending to overpower the guard and sail the vessel to the nearest landfall. Sinclair, aware of the plot through an informant, had crew and convicts locked below decks while the conspirators were identified. One of the mutineers was Philip Farrell. A second mutineer was Thomas Griffiths. Sinclair transferred them to Sirius, where they were flogged, and then sent aboard Prince of Wales for the remainder of the voyage to New South Wales. Sinclair transferred his informant to Scarborough for the informant's own protection.

Arrival in Botany Bay
After passing Tasmania, on 16 January Arthur Phillip transferred from the Flagship Sirius to the tender Supply and in company of the three fastest transports under John Shortland in Alexander, sailed ahead as the advance party, being the first ships to reach Botany Bay on 18 & 19 January 1788.
After the decision was made to move the site of the colony, Alexander arrived at Port Jackson, Sydney, Australia, on 26 January 1788 to unload her convicts.

At Port Jackson Henry Kable, a convict, successfully sued Duncan Sinclair for the loss of his possessions during the voyage. In the first civil court case in Australia, Henry Kable won a restitution of 15 pounds.

Return to England
The British East India Company had hired Alexander in 1786 to carry tea from Canton after she had disembarked her convicts.

Alexander arrived in the Thames on 1 June 1789. Unfortunately there is no readily accessible record of the return voyage.

Alexander carried with her to England the last papers of the French navigator Lapérouse, who was subsequently shipwrecked and never seen again.

Lloyd's Register for 1789 showed Alexanders master as D. Sinclair, and her trade as London-Botany Bay. A later amendment to the entry gave the name of a new master, and a new trade, neither of which is legible. However, the amendment did correct the burthen from 650 to 445 tons (bm).

Subsequent career
Lloyd's Register for 1790 had a legible entry for Alexander. It gave her master as L.D. Bruce, and her trade as London-Dominica. The year of launch was still 1784.

Issues of Lloyd's Register for 1799 to 1801 described Alexander as built in 1783 in Hull, of 468 tons burthen, and as trading between London and Petersburg. They lisedt her master as J. Fraser, and her owner as Leighton. Lloyd's List for 1802 repeated the information, and shows her traveling from London as a transport.

Fate
The Register of Shipping still listed Alexander in 1810, with J. Frazer, master, and Leighton, owner. Her trade is that of a London-based transport. However, it had the notation "LOST" against her name.

Post-script

An Urban Transit Authority First Fleet ferry was named after Alexander in 1985.

Notable passengers 

John Caesar, later a well-known bushranger, and one of the earliest settlers of African descent in Australia.

See also
Journals of the First Fleet
List of convicts on the First Fleet

Notes

Citations

References

External links
First Fleet Online
  [CC-By-SA]

1780s ships
Ships built in Kingston upon Hull
Ships of the First Fleet
Ships of the British East India Company